David Andrew Leo Fincher (born August 28, 1962) is an American director and producer, notably of films, television series and music videos. He has been nominated three times for the Academy Award for Best Director: for The Curious Case of Benjamin Button (2008), The Social Network (2010), and Mank (2020). He won the Golden Globe Award for Best Director and the BAFTA Award for Best Direction for The Social Network.

He is also known for having directed the psychological thrillers Seven (1995), The Game (1997), Fight Club (1999), and Gone Girl (2014) and the mystery thrillers Zodiac (2007) and The Girl with the Dragon Tattoo (2011), as well as being instrumental in the creation of the U.S. television series House of Cards.

His films Zodiac  and  The Social Network are ranked  in BBC's 2016 poll of the greatest motion pictures since 2000.

Directed Academy Award performances
Fincher has directed multiple Oscar-nominated performances.

Major associations

Academy Awards

British Academy Awards

Golden Globe Awards

Grammy Awards

Primetime Emmy Awards

Miscellaneous awards

Cannes Film Festival

Chicago Film Critics Association Awards

Critics' Choice Awards

Dallas–Fort Worth Film Critics Association Awards

Directors Guild of America Awards

Empire Awards

Hugo Award

London Film Critics' Circle

MTV Video Music Awards

National Board of Review

New York Film Critics Circle

Online Film Critics Society Award

Phoenix Film Critics Society Award

Producers Guild of America Awards

San Diego Film Critics Society Awards

Satellite Awards

Saturn Awards

St. Louis Gateway Film Critics Association Awards

Toronto Film Critics Association

Vancouver Film Critics Circle

Washington D.C. Area Film Critics Association Awards

Other awards

References

External links

David Fincher at MVDbase.com
David Fincher at Senses of Cinema: Great Directors Critical Database

Fincher, David